Allen, officially the Municipality of Allen, is a 5th class municipality in the province of Northern Samar, Philippines. According to the 2020 census, it has a population of 25,228 people.

It is located on the northwestern tip of the province, bordering the municipality of Victoria to the south, the municipality of Lavezares to the east, and the strategic San Bernardino Strait to both the north and west.

Allen is an important port for inter-island transport, specifically between the island of Samar and the island of Luzon.

Etymology
Before the Spanish colonisation of the Philippines, the original Malayan name of the town was Minapa-a. During the Spanish colonisation period, the name of the town was changed to La Granja. The name Allen was given by the Americans in honor of the American General Henry Tureman Allen,the military governor of the Visayas after the victory of the Americans over the Spaniards in the Spanish–American War. During the Japanese occupation, the town's name was changed to Tanaman, in accordance with Executive Order No. 110 signed in December 1942, to be "in line with the objective of the Greater East Asia War of eradicating all traces of Anglo-Saxon influence in East Asia."

History
Allen is part of Northern Samar which is according to Australian studies, a part of the Philippines which is the homeland of the Polynesians. Otley Bayer said that there are already people in the Philippines 250,000 years ago and this was confirmed by a French study which says that the Philippines has been populated by men as early as 700,000 years ago. Some old Filipino historians still have the mindset of "Filipinos are savage and it has to be discovered and cultured by anything foreign". These historians refuses to mention that there is a civilization of Viking – like people based in the Lakanate of Lawan in Northern Samar (Samar was derived from Samaria). The Samar civilization was once headed by Datu Iberein as written by historian Henry Scott, and take note of the name, very Hebrew, consistent with Jewish Samar from Samaria. These people have siday (native epic) in which one of them is Bingi of Lawan, as mentioned by historian Alcina. They have Almuraya which is now an ancient ruins and they have royal burial jars—all evidences would point that this civilization could be the Ophir, the homeland of the Polynesians and Viking – like people who sent people to different parts of the Philippines and islands in the Pacific Ocean, including the people of Taiwan.The area of present-day Allen was originally populated by natives of Malay stock from the western and central portions of the island of Samar, particularly Catbalogan and Calbayog. Successive migrations to Allen from other islands that are near Allen were characterised by several waves. Malays from the neighbouring Bicol Peninsula in what is now Sorsogon crossed what is now the San Bernardino Strait using small sailing barges, trading with the locals before settling in, and inter-marrying with the local Malays many years after. Simultaneously, Malays of southern stock from Bohol through the islands of Capul and San Antonio crossed the strait and settled in the area.

The heavy waves of migration from Bicol to Allen in Samar in the course of the centuries is attested by the fact that almost 70% of the peoples of Allen trace their ancestries to the families in Bicol, from the province of Sorsogon.

The first recorded persons to have their names officially entered into a Spanish census in Allen were that of Cosmenia Cajandab and Mariano Cabacang; both surnames originated from the island of Capul.

Allen is also the hometown of Filipino sailing hero Florentino Das who holds the earliest record of a Trans-Pacific crossing from Hawaii to the Philippines. A memorial commemorating his achievement of 1956 is found in the town.

Geography

Barangays
Allen is politically subdivided into 20 barangays. 
	Alejandro Village (Santiago)	
	Bonifacio	
	Cabacungan	
	Calarayan	
	Frederic	
	Guin-arawayan	
	Imelda	
	Jubasan	
	Kinabranan Zone I (Poblacion)	
	Kinabranan Zone II (Poblacion)	
	Kinaguitman	
	Lagundi	
	Lipata	
	Londres	
	Lo-oc	
	Sabang Zone I (Poblacion)	
	Sabang Zone II (Poblacion)	
	Santa Rita	
	Tasvilla	
	Victoria

Climate

Demographics

Economy

Infrastructure

Allen serves as an important transit point, connecting Samar and other islands with Luzon. It is opposite the Luzon transit point in the municipality of Matnog, Sorsogon. The primary modes of transport are the inter-island bus route via the Maharlika Highway, and the ferry crossing the San Bernardino Strait.

Transportation

Ferry Service
Ferries cross the strategically important Strait of San Bernardino, transporting passengers and vehicles to and from Allen in Samar and Matnog in Luzon. Travel time ranges between one hour to 2 hours depending on the speed of the ferry.

Bus
Buses from the various provinces of the Visayas and Mindanao bound for various destinations in Luzon pass through Allen, riding the ferry services of Allen to Matnog, and vice versa.

The bus terminals servicing the numerous passengers crossing the San Bernardino Strait are located at the piers and ports that are operational in Allen. Booking offices for buses that ply the route are also located at these terminals.

Accommodations
A number of relatively low-priced hotels and inns within the town serve most of the transit passengers for overnight stay, specially during bad weather when some stranded passengers take refuge in the small hotels and inns. During bad weather conditions, ferries cannot cross the San Bernardino Strait due to high waves.

See also
List of renamed cities and municipalities in the Philippines

References

External links

 [ Philippine Standard Geographic Code]
 Philippine Census Information
 Local Governance Performance Management System

Municipalities of Northern Samar
Port cities and towns in the Philippines